Chuckles are jelly candies coated with a light layer of sugar. They come in five flavors: cherry, lemon, lime, orange, and licorice. Each package of Chuckles contains one piece of each flavor. The candies are made with corn syrup, sugar, modified and unmodified cornstarch, and natural and artificial flavors and colors.

The Chuckles brand was first produced in 1921 by Fred W. Amend. The only factory was in Danville, Illinois. Nabisco bought the Chuckles Company in 1970. A management buyout occurred in 1986, and the company was quickly acquired by Leaf. Leaf's US properties were sold to The Hershey Company in 1996 and the Chuckles trademark was licensed to Hershey. Hershey sub-licensed Chuckles to Farley's & Sathers in 2002, which later merged with Ferrara Pan in 2012 (also owned by Catterton Partners), forming the Ferrara Candy Company. The Chuckles trademark is currently owned by Iconic IP Interests, LLC. 

Also available are Chuckles Minis in classic flavors and occasional seasonal varieties.

In popular culture

 From 1974 to 1975, Chuckles sponsored stuntman Evel Knievel. 

In the film Taxi Driver (1976) Travis Bickle (Robert De Niro) buys some Chuckles from the concessions stand at the adult cinema. He tells the concessions girl (Diahnne Abbott) that he prefers Jujubes because they last longer. 
In the novel Rules of Attraction by Bret Easton Ellis, Paul, one of the main characters, purchases a pack of Chuckles candy in one scene

In the Seinfeld episode "The Heart Attack", while driving George Costanza to the hospital in an ambulance, his paramedics argue about whether one of them ate the other's Chuckles. As a result of the subsequent accident, Jerry (Seinfeld) and George end up in the hospital, and George has his tonsils removed.

In the Night Court episode "Earthquake", Dan and Roz are trapped in an elevator with two sumo wrestlers. Both of the wrestlers are Japanese with limited English, but Dan tells Roz that he has a package of Chuckles, spelling out the candy's name instead of stating it, hoping the wrestlers wouldn't understand. But the wrestlers understand and know the candy, prompting them to corner and intimidate Dan until he gives them the candy.

See also
 List of confectionery brands

References

External links
 Ferrara Candy product page
 Chuckles Candy product page

Gummi candies
Brand name confectionery
Ferrara Candy Company brands
Products introduced in 1921
Farley's & Sathers Candy Company brands